Rodrigo Archanjo de Matos or simply Rodrigão (born April 22, 1983), was a Brazilian central defender. He played for Villa Nova-MG on loan from Cruzeiro.

Contract
Villa Nova-MG (Loan) 1 June 2007 to 31 December 2007
Cruzeiro 1 January 2006 to 31 December 2007

External links
 sambafoot
 CBF
 zerozero.pt
 villanovense

1983 births
Living people
People from Ourinhos
Brazilian footballers
Cruzeiro Esporte Clube players
Paulista Futebol Clube players
Ipatinga Futebol Clube players
Sport Club do Recife players
Association football defenders
Footballers from São Paulo (state)